{{DISPLAYTITLE:Chi1 Orionis}}

Chi1 Orionis (χ1 Ori, χ1 Orionis) is a star about 28 light years away. It is in the constellation Orion, where it can be seen in the tip of the hunter's upraised club.

χ1 Ori is a G0V star. It is listed in the General Catalog of Variable Stars as an RS Canum Venaticorum variable, varying between visual magnitude 4.38 and 4.41. Stępień and Geyer measured its period to be 5.5 days.

χ1 Ori has a faint companion with a mass estimated at about 15% of the mass of the Sun, and an orbital period of 14.1 years. The companion orbits an average distance of 6.1 AU from the primary, but has a fairly high orbital eccentricity, ranging from 3.3 AU out to 8.9 AU from the primary. Because of this red dwarf companion, the likelihood of habitable planets in this system is low.  It is thought that the companion is a red dwarf still contracting towards the main sequence.

A necessary condition for the existence of a planet in this system are stable zones where the object can remain in orbit for long intervals. For hypothetical planets in a circular orbit around the individual members of this star system, this maximum orbital radius is computed to be 1.01 AU for the primary and 0.41 AU for the secondary. (Note that the orbit of the Earth is 1 AU from the Sun.) A planet orbiting outside of both stars would need to be at least 18.4 AU distant.

χ1 Ori is a candidate stream star member of the Ursa Major Moving Group, although there is some evidence to the contrary.

See also
 List of star systems within 25–30 light-years

References

External links
 Chi-1 Orionis by Professor Jim Kaler.
 Chi1 Orionis 2 at SolStation.

G-type main-sequence stars
M-type main-sequence stars
Orionis, 54
Binary stars
Ursa Major Moving Group

Orion (constellation)
Orionis, Chi
BD+20 1162
Orionis, 54
0222
039587
027913
2047